Jarqavieh Sofla may refer to:
 Jarqavieh Sofla District
 Jarqavieh Sofla Rural District